Sergei Alexandrovich Kapkov (born 10 December 1975) is a Russian politician, head of the Culture and Urban Development Center, School of Economics, Moscow State University.

Former minister of Moscow government, head of Moscow City Department of Culture (30 September 2011 – 10 March 2015), head of the National Academy of Football Fund, highly supported by Roman Abramovich. The Fund under Kapkov leadership was the one who hired Guus Hiddink as the chief coach of the Russian national team.

Biography 
Kapkov was born in Gorkiy (modern name Nizhny Novgorod) in 1975. 

He graduated from Volga-Vyatka Academy of State Service (from 2010 became a subdivision of Russian Presidential Academy of National Economy and Public Administration) in 1998 with a bachelor's degree in state and regional management. After that, he spent three years (from 1998 to 2001) studying social philosophy at Volga-Vyatka Academy of State Service. 

In his student years, Kapkov combined university study with work for election campaigns in the region. From 1994 to 1998, he worked as a deputy's assistant of the Legislative Assembly of Nizhny Novgorod region. Many newspapers described him as a talented political strategist: it was reported that he was involved in the activities of election headquarters of "a number of candidates for governor", including Boris Nemtsov (in the elections of the Nizhny Novgorod Region Administration won in December 1995). In addition, he participated in the political movement "Our Home – Russia" in the elections to the state Duma of the second convocation (1995). In 1998, he led the election campaign of Alexander Sharonov, the candidate for deputy of the Nizhny Novgorod Region Legislative Assembly.

Career goals

Work in Chukotka region
Kapkov met Roman Abramovich, one of the main shareholder of Sibneft that time. In 1999, Kapkov took part in Abramovich's election campaign to the State Duma. Kapkov became a primary assistant of Abramovich in the Duma. News media describe Kapkov as "one of the leading managers in charge of media relations and public outreach".

In 2000, he became the head of governor election campaign in the Chukotka region for Abramovich, who won the election with more than 90% of electoral votes.

In 2001, Kapkov became the head of public relations and digital media department at Chukotka region. The same year, he took over the department of culture, sport, tourism and young population policy and became one of the youngest ministers at Chukotka region. He stood behind couple modernization in the region, such as first regional radio (radio "Purga" – "Snowstorm") and first independent TV-channel "Belyi Veter" (White Wind).

Duma member 
In 2003, Kapkov was elected as a deputy in the lower house State Duma. He was a member of the lower house committee for civil, criminal, arbitration and procedural legislation. In 2007, Kapkov took another turn in the state Duma when Vladimir Putin declined his invitation to become a deputy in Russia's new parliament and handed over his seat to Kapkov, who became deputy head of the State Duma Committee for Information Policy, Technology and Communication.

Head of Gorky Park 
In 2011, Kapkov stepped down from the position of the state Duma deputy to start magic renovation and revival of Central Moscow park – Gorky Park. Within months, the park was free of old, dated amusement attractions and old-style cafés. Instead of these park visitors and city guests received sensitive customer-service approach trendy outdoor activities and fully renovated park with a waterfront.

Work in Moscow city Culture Department 
What I was doing, I regarded as a priority for the people of Moscow and the foundation for personal freedoms, personal space and the urban environment".

Kapkov was the force behind the transformation and revival of Moscow's culture. As Moscow's minister of culture (2011–2015), he undertook major urban regeneration initiatives and introduced radically new cultural policies. Under his watch, many public spaces, parks, and riverside areas were revitalized, and new pedestrian zones, street fairs, exhibitions, and music and arts festivals were created.

After Kapkov's reforms and all his battles, regional administrations across the country have suddenly become interested in the renovation of parks and the rejuvenation of public space. In Moscow, many of the positive changes to the fabric of the city are hard to undo, whatever happens. Many people worry there are changes in the air, but hope is far from lost – with some suggesting that if the Europeanisation of Moscow is over, the end of this copycat urban development may not be such a bad thing anyway.

Soccer/football influence 

In June 2004, he became chief of the board of directors at National Football Academy. The main purpose of this organization was improving infrastructure and setting up new training centers for talented players at a national level. The annual budget of the fund was almost $30 million.

Awards 
 GQ magazine 2011 award "Discovery of the Year" – for frantic activity as director of Gorky Park.
 By President executive order, Kapkov was granted a medal "for national population census"

References 

1975 births
Living people
Politicians from Nizhny Novgorod
Russian football chairmen and investors
Academic staff of Moscow State University
United Russia politicians
Fourth convocation members of the State Duma (Russian Federation)
Fifth convocation members of the State Duma (Russian Federation)